The 4th Criterium of Polish Speedway League Aces was the 1985 version of the Criterium of Polish Speedway Leagues Aces. It took place on March 24 in the Polonia Stadium in Bydgoszcz, Poland.

Final standings

Sources 
 Roman Lach - Polish Speedway Almanac

See also 

Criterium of Aces
Criterium of Aces
1985